Events from the year 1729 in Canada.

Incumbents
French Monarch: Louis XV
British and Irish Monarch: George II

Governors
Governor General of New France: Charles de la Boische, Marquis de Beauharnois
Colonial Governor of Louisiana: Étienne Perier
Governor of Nova Scotia: Lawrence Armstrong
Governor of Placentia: Samuel Gledhill

Events
 La Vérendrye became first commandant of the Posts of the West. He was posted to Fort Kaministiquia in this year and began the western expansion in 1731.
 Natchez attacked French Fort Rosalie and French settlements nearby after the French commander of the fort, Sieur Chepart, ordered them to abandon their village of White Apple. The Natchez wiped out the entire settlement and captured Fort Rosalie. In 1730 and 1731 the French, aided by the Choctaw, launched two counterattacks out of New Orleans, capturing and selling into plantation slavery most of the tribe and its smaller allies. A few bands found refuge among the Chickasaw, Creek, and Cherokee.

Births
Joseph Frederick Wallet DesBarres, governor of Cape Breton.

Deaths
Jean-François Du Verger de Verville, designer of the Fortress of Louisbourg.

Historical documents
New York governor says Six Nations want garrison at Oswego trading house and will assist against "any Power that dares to Attack it"

N.Y. governor says Oswego trading house will protect Indigenous fur suppliers from "the wonted abuses of the Handlers or Traders"

Ten New York acts about trade with Indigenous people (1720-1729) repealed because "the execution of them are grievous and oppressive"

Irish and New England families want to settle east of Kennebec River boundary of Nova Scotia, but not in French-dominated N.S.

How valid are French claims from Kennebeck to Canso (though "reconquered" by British) in current settlement plans? (Note: "savages" used)

Keep Massachusetts government out of new Maine settlement because "incensed Indians" were cheated of land by "fraudelent practices"

French say "live well with the English" to Penobscot, who okay Pemaquid settlement, but label any move past Saint George River unfriendly

Penobscot and Nanrantsouak welcome Pemaquid settlement, even if none of them "had a right to sell any, for it all belonged to the King"

Nova Scotia proper, and not part east of Kennebeck, should be promoted to settlers, with incentives for men to marry Indigenous women

German Palatines and others should settle in new province (to be called Georgia) east of Kennebeck, and also in Nova Scotia proper

"For security against the Frenchified Indians," Nova Scotia Palatines should be in villages 3 miles apart with 60 families each

Surveyor of His Majesty's Woods says "Indians" will be dangerous and Bay of Fundy Acadians obstructive when he works in Nova Scotia

Mindful of "safety and welfare" of Nova Scotia, governor glad to find Annapolis River Acadians are all willing to sign oath to King

Insubordination and arrogance of two government officials add to "great disorder" in Nova Scotia, says Lt. Governor Lawrence Armstrong

Canso fishery survey finds all fishers are in schooners based in New England and catch fish as far as 120 miles out on banks

On Île-Royale (Cape Breton Island), Louisbourg has 1,500 people, 7 companies of soldiers "strongly fortify'd," and "Irish Papists"

Privy Council orders that governors be instructed not to confiscate whale products of Nova Scotia and other fisheries

New Seal of Nova Scotia depicts land, fishing and fur trading, with motto "Terrae Marisque Opes" (Wealth of Land and Sea)

Newfoundland fur trade lost because "by their constant cruel usage to the Indians wherever they meet them, all traffick [is] cutt off"

New England merchants in Newfoundland sometimes are paid in fish, taking worst sort to ship for "negroes" in West Indies

Extending too much credit to Newfoundland fishers "is certainly the occasion of all the faults, disputes and disorders that happen"

"Long committed and often repeated" - Infractions in Newfoundland come of Admirals' irresponsible, self-serving and selective enforcement

Newfoundland's "proper remedies" include trial of tyrannical Placentia governor and increasing Commodore's military and judicial powers

New Newfoundland governor instructed to stop (with few exceptions) direct imports from other colonies and European countries

"The inhabitants seem pleas'd" - Governor Osborn appoints three justices of the peace and several constables in St. John's and region

Poole merchants complain of ships from outside England fishing in Newfoundland in contravention of statute

"With confounded Rum they ever stink" - Navy chaplain calls "most" Newfoundlanders "sottish," "frightful" and "in a willing Banishment"

References

 
Canada
29